Channa Ediri Bandanage (born 22 September 1978) is a Sri Lankan international footballer who played for Blue Star SC as a forward. Bandanage has won the most number of caps for Sri Lanka national football team with 64 and is the second leading goal scorer for Sri Lanka. Since his retirement from football Banadanage has been working as a gravedigger.

Honours

Club
Ratnam Sports Club
 Premier League: 2007–08, 2011–12

BG Sports Club
 Second Division: 2012

References

External links

Minister to assist Channa at ThePaper.com
Channa news at PDFslide.us

1978 births
Living people
Sri Lankan footballers
Sri Lankan expatriate footballers
Sri Lanka international footballers
Ratnam SC players
Expatriate footballers in India
Sri Lankan expatriate sportspeople in India
Sri Lankan expatriate sportspeople in the Maldives
Expatriate footballers in the Maldives
Victory Sports Club players
Negambo Youth players
Association football forwards
Sri Lanka Football Premier League players